The Love Gun Tour was a concert tour by Kiss, in support of Love Gun.

History 
This was the first tour where Ace Frehley sang lead vocals, on "Shock Me". The three Los Angeles shows were recorded for Alive II. This is the only tour to feature the song "Hooligan" in the set list. This is the first tour to feature "Calling Dr. Love" in the set list. Cheap Trick and Styx were the opening acts throughout the tour.

Criss had gotten injured when the van carrying equipment and the other members had overturned, when the band was practicing at an airport hangar and preparing to travel to Canada for the first show.

In the tour program for the band's final tour, Stanley reflected on the tour:

Reception 
John Kafentzis, a report from The Spokesman-Review who attended the Seattle performance stated that the choreography was precise and the stunts were well-planned, leaving no time to practice music. He however, criticized that each song sounded like the last, which he said "sounds like the Saturday night rumble of dozens of mufflers on Riverside". He continued, by stating that the band put on a show and concluding that the well-behaved audience "got their $7 worth".

Tour setlist 
 "I Stole Your Love"
 "Take Me" 
 "Ladies Room"
 "Firehouse" (Gene Simmons Firebreathing)
 "Love Gun"
 "Hooligan"
 "Makin' Love"
 "Christine Sixteen"
 "Shock Me" (Ace Frehley Guitar-Solo)
 "I Want You"
 "Calling Dr. Love"
 "Shout It Out Loud"
 "God of Thunder" (Gene Simmons Bass-Solo and Bloodspitting, Peter Criss Drum-Solo)
 "Rock and Roll All Nite" (Paul Stanley destroying his guitar at the end of the song)
Encore
 "Detroit Rock City"
 "Beth"
 "Black Diamond"

Tour dates

Personnel
Paul Stanley – vocals, rhythm guitar
Gene Simmons – vocals, bass
Peter Criss – drums, vocals
Ace Frehley – lead guitar, vocals

References

Bibliography

Kiss (band) concert tours
1977 concert tours